R U There is a 2010 Taiwanese-Dutch drama film directed by David Verbeek. It was entered into the Un Certain Regard section of the 2010 Cannes Film Festival. At the 2010 Netherlands Film Festival the film won the awards for Best Cinematography and Best Sound Design.

Cast
 Stijn Koomen as Jitze
 Huan-Ru Ke as Min Min
 Tom De Hoog as coach Luc
 Phi Nguyen as Hai Li
 Pavio Bilak as Vlad
 David Eugene Callegari as John
 David Davis as Paulo
 Amanda Philipson as Mia
 Robert Samudion as Brazilian Boy

References

External links
 

2010 films
2010s Dutch-language films
2010s English-language films
English-language Dutch films
English-language Taiwanese films
2010 drama films
Films shot in Taiwan
Taiwanese drama films
Dutch drama films
2010 multilingual films
Dutch multilingual films
Taiwanese multilingual films